The Crane Creek Lumber Company  (CCLC) was the first major lumber company to operate in the Modoc National Forest.  Its business was located at the mouth of the Crane Creek Canyon.  In the 1920s the company moved to Lawson Creek and built the railroad spur in 1928.  The spur was built as the result of Crane Creek's successful bid to the National Forest Service, in 1926, for 194 million board feet of timber in the Modoc National Forest's Fandango Logging Unit.  Ponderosa Pine was a primary species that was logged.  The company built a planing mill and box factory at Willow Creek near the NCO. In the 1930s a fire destroyed the Lawson Creek operations of the company.

The company also built a standard gauge logging railroad which operated from a junction with the Nevada-California-Oregon Railway (NCO) at Willow Creek, California (link is incorrect Willow Creek), running southeast for 16.5 miles into the Modoc National Forest.  The track was constructed in 1928, abandoned in 1930, and removed in 1934.  The railroad used an oil fueled Shay locomotive that hauled two flatcars of lumber.  The Shay, Numbered #1 (Shay Serial Number 2733) was built by Shay in 1913 for the Crookston Lumber Company.  The CCLC bought the locomotive in 1928.  The locomotive was sold again in 1947.

References 
Willow Creek RootsWeb: CASHASTA-L [CAShasta] Clippings From Velma
Picture of CCLC #1 (Shay)
Modoc National Forest

See also
List of defunct California railroads

Defunct companies based in California
History of Modoc County, California
Modoc National Forest
Logging railroads in the United States
Defunct California railroads
American companies established in 1928
American companies disestablished in 1930
1928 establishments in California
1930 disestablishments in California
Renewable resource companies established in 1928
Defunct forest products companies of the United States